The Amateur Gentleman is a 1936 British drama film directed by Thornton Freeland and starring Douglas Fairbanks Jr., Elissa Landi, Gordon Harker and Margaret Lockwood, with music by Richard Addinsell. It is based on the 1913 novel The Amateur Gentleman by Jeffery Farnol. In an effort to prove his father's innocence of a charge of stealing, a young man disguises himself as a gentleman and travels to Regency London.

It was made at Elstree Studios with sets designed by Edward Carrick. The story was previously filmed in the silent era in Britain The Amateur Gentleman and in Hollywood as The Amateur Gentleman 1926 with Richard Barthelmess.

Plot
Innkeeper and ex-boxer John Barty is bent on making his son Barnabas a gentleman, but has his doubts after he finds out that the younger Barty is appalled when a man is hanged for stealing a mere five shillings. Then some aristocrats arrive at the inn. Barnabas is entranced by the beautiful Lady Cleone Meredith. She is engaged to Louis Chichester, who does not conceal from her the fact that he is marrying her for her wealth. Also in the party is the equally poverty-stricken Pauline Darville, the woman Chichester had romanced before Cleone.

As Cleone's grandfather, the Marquess of Comberhurst, prepares for bed, he gives John Barty a valuable string of pearls to put away for safekeeping. This is seen by Chichester. That night, the Marquess is robbed. Chichester accuses the innkeeper. Some of the stolen items are found in John Barty's possession, though not the pearls, and the unfortunate man is taken away, to be hanged in six weeks.

Barnabas and Natty Bell, a family friend, find a partially burned note in the room of Lord Ronald, Cleone's neer-do-well brother. Barnabas decides to insinuate himself into the aristocrats' social circle to uncover the real thief. The pair travel to London. There, Barnabas (or "John Beverley", as he calls himself) gets into a fight with a carter in the street; the Prince Regent bets on him and wins. This chance meeting gains Beverley an entree into society, where he is introduced to Lady Cleone and her set.

At a ball, Beverley wins 50,000 guineas from Ronald, despite Cleone's plea to stop wagering with her brother. Ronald cannot pay and has to write an IOU; when Beverley examines it, the handwriting is not the same as on the note he found. He tears up the IOU. Chichester is suspicious of the newcomer. He questions Pauline to make sure there is nothing linking them to the robbery. She recalls that she threw a stolen note into the fireplace, but does not recall if there was a lit fire.

Meanwhile, Beverley reveals to the grateful Cleone that he loves her and that he used loaded dice to make her brother lose. He takes her to see his father in prison, and there tells her who he is. He helps his father escape.

After Cleone breaks her engagement, Chichester and Pauline search Beverley's lodgings while he is away. They find the scrap, but then Pauline implores Chichester to go away with her and refuses to return the necklace he gave her unless he agrees. Beverley returns and finds Pauline alone. As he is questioning her, she is stabbed in the back through an open window.

Chichester obtains a warrant accusing Beverley of murdering Pauline and goes to a ball where he is expected. Beverley manages to get away, driving a coach bearing Cleone and the Marquess, with Chichester in hot pursuit. Beverley returns to the Barty inn, where his father and Natty are waiting. There, the Bartys are arrested, but it is all a ruse. Chichester is tricked into identifying a handkerchief as his. It was found on Pauline's body and contains the stolen pearls. Chichester, after trying to stab Beverley, is taken away. Cleone suggests she and Beverely elope; as they are leaving, they run into her brother Ronald and Georgina Huntstanton, who have had the same idea.

Cast
 Douglas Fairbanks Jr. as John Beverley aka Barnabas Barty 
 Elissa Landi as Lady Cleone Meredith 
 Gordon Harker as Natty Bell
 Basil Sydney as Louis Chichester
 Hugh Williams as Lord Ronald Meredith
 Irene Browne as Lady Huntstanton 
 Athole Stewart as Marquess of Comberhurst
 Coral Browne as Pauline Darville
 Margaret Lockwood as Georgina Huntstanton 
 Esme Percy as John Townsend 
 Frank Bertram as Belcher 
 Gilbert Davis as Prince Regent 
 Frank Pettingell as John Barty
 June Duprez as Minor role

Production
It was an early role for Margaret Lockwood.

Reception
The Amateur Gentleman was voted the tenth best British film of 1936.

References

External links

The Amateur Gentleman at TCMDB
The Amateur Gentleman at Britmovie
Review of film at Variety

1936 films
1930s historical drama films
British historical drama films
British black-and-white films
Remakes of British films
1930s English-language films
Films directed by Thornton Freeland
Films scored by Richard Addinsell
Films based on British novels
Films set in London
Films set in the 1810s
Sound film remakes of silent films
Cultural depictions of George IV
1936 drama films
Films scored by Walter Goehr
Films shot at British International Pictures Studios
1930s British films